Red Rooster is an Australian fast food chain founded in 1972 that specialises in roast chicken, chicken burgers and fried chicken. Their product range includes whole roasts, half roasts, wraps, burgers, salads, beverages and desserts. It is owned by private equity company PAG Asia Capital, which also own Oporto and Chicken Treat.

History

The original Red Rooster store was a small take-away shop located at 98 Wanneroo Road, Tuart Hill, specialising in take-away chicken dinners etc. This opened about 1970/71 and after only about 12 months trading it closed and disappeared. The Kailis family, who liked the idea, opened a Red Rooster store in the Perth suburb of Kelmscott in 1972.
 
Myer (later part of Coles Myer) purchased the business in 1981. In 1986, Coles Myer bought the Big Rooster chain to expand into the eastern states (except non-Steggles' Queensland stores, formerly known as "Big Rooster", which were purchased in 1992), and renamed the stores "Red Rooster". Big Rooster remains operational in Papua New Guinea. 

In 2002, Red Rooster was purchased by Western Australian company Australian Fast Foods, which owned the competing Chicken Treat fast food chain.  In 2007, both chains were sold for $180 million to a consortium formed by the management and Quadrant Private Equity.

In 2009, the Red Rooster chain in New Zealand closed its stores. The first New Zealand outlet, in Takanini had opened in December 2004.

In 2010, Red Rooster changed company-owned stores to franchises. In 2011, Quadrant Private Equity sold parent company Quick Service Restaurant Holdings (later renamed Craveable Brands) to Archer Capital. 

In 2019, ownership switched to PAG Asia Capital when the Hong Kong based private equity group bought Craveable Brands for about $500 million.
 In Queensland later that year, seven Red Rooster stores on the Sunshine Coast closed when the franchisee went into voluntary administration.

Marketing and promotions

In 2009, Red Rooster ran an ad campaign called "They don't get it in America" featuring comedian Tom Gleeson in the United States asking people about Red Rooster.

Since 2009, Red Rooster has been a signatory of AQSRII (Australian QSR Initiative for Responsible Advertising and Marketing to Children). It has also taken up a self-regulatory standpoint regarding advertising aimed specifically at children and is a long-standing signatory of the Australian Quick Service Restaurant Industry Initiative for Responsible Advertising and Marketing to Children.

In 2010, Red Rooster was a sponsor of Supercars Championship team Holden Racing Team. In 2016, the team returned as the title sponsor of the Sydney SuperNight 300.

In 2011, Red Rooster changed to promoting its restaurants as healthy, fresh and quick.

Online ordering
In September 2014, Red Rooster launched its trial delivery service in New South Wales, in Sydney from the Baulkham Hills restaurant, in partnership with Menulog. As well as delivery to homes, it was announced delivery options to businesses, sporting clubs and local organisations would be available.

See also
 List of fast-food chicken restaurants
 List of restaurant chains in Australia

References

External links

1972 establishments in Australia
Fast-food chains of Australia
Fast-food franchises
Fast-food poultry restaurants
Restaurants established in 1972
Restaurants in Sydney